The Council on Tall Buildings and Urban Habitat (CTBUH) is an international body in the field of tall buildings and sustainable urban design. A non-profit organization based at the Monroe Building in Chicago, Illinois, United States, the CTBUH announces the title of "The World's Tallest Building" and is widely considered to be an authority on the official height of tall buildings. Its stated mission is to study and report "on all aspects of the planning, design, and construction of tall buildings." The CTBUH was founded at Lehigh University in 1969 by Lynn S. Beedle, where its office remained until October 2003 when it moved to the Illinois Institute of Technology in Chicago.

Ranking tall buildings

The CTBUH ranks the height of buildings using three different methods:

Height to architectural top: This is the main criterion under which the CTBUH ranks the height of buildings. Heights are measured from the level of the lowest, significant, open-air, pedestrian entrance to the top of the building, inclusive of spires but excluding items such as flagpoles and antennae.
Highest occupied floor: Height to the floor level of the highest floor that is occupied by residents, workers or other building users on a consistent basis.
Height to tip: Height to the highest point of the building, including antennae, flagpoles, and technical equipment.

A category measuring to the top of the roof was removed from the ranking criteria in November 2009. This is because flat-topped skyscrapers are not as common in the modern era as skyscrapers with intricate spire designs and parapet features atop their roofs, making it more difficult to define the roof of a building.

The CTBUH insist that a building should only be added to the official tallest list when it is (i) topped out structurally and architecturally, (ii) fully clad, and (iii) open for business, or at least partially open. This became the CTBUH official definition of a building's "completion".

The CTBUH maintains an extensive database (named The Skyscraper Center) of the tallest buildings in the world, organized by various categories. Buildings under construction are also included, although not ranked until completion. The CTBUH also produces an annual list of the 10 tallest buildings completed in that particular year. Topping the 2008 list was the  Shanghai World Financial Center in Shanghai, the then tallest building in the world according to the criteria of highest occupied floor, and home to the world's highest observation deck. All in all, six of the 10 tallest buildings completed in 2008 are located in Asia, three in the Middle East and one in North America.

Events
The CTBUH also hosts annual conferences and a World Congress every three to five years. The 2012 World Congress was held in Shanghai from September 19 to 21 . The next World Congress was held in Chicago between 28 October and 2 November 2019.
The CTBUH also bestows Tall Building Awards each year, with four regional awards to the Americas, Europe, Africa and the Middle East, and Asia and Australasia. Among these four regional awards, one is given the "Best Tall Building Award Overall." There are also two lifetime achievement awards. Starting in 2010, these awards are presented at a symposium and dinner held on the Illinois Institute of Technology's campus. In 2012 the CTBUH added two new awards for Innovation and Performance.

Publications
In addition to the monthly newsletter and daily updated global news archive, the CTBUH publishes a quarterly CTBUH Journal.  The Journal includes peer-reviewed technical papers, in-depth project case studies, book reviews, interviews with prominent persons in the tall building industry, and much more.

The CTBUH also publishes guidebooks, reference manuals, and monographs related to the tall building industry.  In 2006 it published the book 101 of the World's Tallest Buildings in conjunction with author and CTBUH member Georges Binder, a reference to 101 of the world's tallest skyscrapers. It includes photos, plans, details on architects, engineers and stakeholders, and comprehensive technical data on each building. Since 2008 it has published a Best Tall Buildings book to accompany that year's awards.

Awards

The CTBUH grants several awards every year.

Best Tall Building Overall Award
2007: Beetham Tower, Manchester, UK
2008: Shanghai World Financial Center, Shanghai, China
2009: Linked Hybrid, Beijing, China
2010: Broadcasting Place, Leeds, UK.
2010: Global Icon award, Burj Khalifa is the first recipient of this award announced on 25 October 2010., Dubai, UAE.
2011: KfW Westarkade, Frankfurt, Germany.
2012: Doha Tower, Doha, Qatar.
2013: CCTV Headquarters, Beijing, China.
2014: One Central Park, Sydney, Australia.
2015: Bosco Verticale, Milan, Italy.
2016: Shanghai Tower, Shanghai, China
2018: Oasia Hotel Downtown, Singapore
2019: Salesforce Tower, San Francisco, USA
2021: Vancouver House, Vancouver, Canada

Research
The CTBUH works with institutions of higher-education from around the world in researching projects related to tall building design.

Building as used on the CTBUH's www.skyscrapercenter.com

See also
 CTBUH Skyscraper Award
 Emporis
 Vanity height

References

External links
 
 Australian chapter of the Council on Tall Buildings and Urban Habitat
 CTBUH Skyscraper Center Database
  CTBUH Technical Papers
  CTBUH Global Tall Building News Archive
  CTBUH Newsletter Archive
  CTBUH Design Research

Urban planning organizations
Lehigh University
Organizations established in 1969
1969 establishments in Illinois
Organizations based in Chicago